Warren W. Brandt Hall is a 17-story dormitory, that is located on the northeast corner of the Virginia Commonwealth University Monroe Park campus. The building is adjacent to Rhoads Hall, and houses 640 freshmen students. The building was dedicated on August 24, 2005 and opened for the 2005–06 academic school year,  being the newest residence building on campus until the construction of Gladding Residence Center, Phase III.

The building is named in Warren W. Brandt, who was the first president of VCU.

References

External links
 Brandt Hall

Buildings and structures in Richmond, Virginia
Virginia Commonwealth University
School buildings completed in 2005
Skyscrapers in Richmond, Virginia
Residential skyscrapers in Virginia
2005 establishments in Virginia